Lake Placid is a series of American monster horror comedy films created by David E. Kelley. Produced and distributed by Sony Pictures Home Entertainment, the series began with Lake Placid (1999) directed by Steve Miner, and was followed by five television sequels, Lake Placid 2 (2007) by David Flores, Lake Placid 3 (2010) by Griff Furst, Lake Placid: The Final Chapter (2012) by Don Michael Paul, Lake Placid vs. Anaconda (2015) by A.B. Stone, being a crossover with the Anaconda series, and Lake Placid: Legacy (2018) by Darrell Roodt. Each installment revolves around the presence of giant, 30-foot-long man-eating crocodiles in the fictional location of Black Lake, Maine, and the efforts of various groups to capture or destroy the creatures. All of the films (except for Legacy) reference members of the fictitious Bickerman family.

Background 
During the production of the original film, Stan Winston Studios were hired to produce the 30 feet long animatronic crocodile, which was covered in a water-resistant urethane skin and functioned underwater using waterproofed hydraulics. In 2014, following the re-release of the original film on Blu-ray, Daily Dead interviewed director Steve Miner about the production of the film. According to Miner: "The first thing I did when I got on board Lake Placid was send the script over to Stan. Stan went ahead and began building the main 18-20 foot croc out of pocket even before we had locked down our financing or anything like that. He may have spent close to a million dollars on him- it may not have been that much, but it was close. And that’s such a testament to Stan- I kept telling him that I didn’t even know if we were going to be making the darned movie, but he just kept moving ahead. What I didn’t know when I took on Lake Placid was that it had already been turned down by all the studios so when it came time to put the movie together, it was a little more challenging than I originally thought it was going to be. That’s when I brought in Mike Medavoy and he really got this movie done for us. We started making the rounds again and eventually Fox ended up picking up the movie the second time. Mike then brought these French investors over to Stan’s shop to see the crocodile in action and Stan finished that thing up just in the nick of time. It ended up working out so perfectly though because Stan had the croc working perfectly where his jaws would open and close, his eyes and head were able to move around and he could move the other parts and shake him like he was attacking something. That’s what ended up impressing the investors and it’s because of Stan that we were able to finance Lake Placid. Had it not been for him or for Mike, we wouldn’t be talking about it now".

Films

Lake Placid (1999) 

A group attempts to destroy a giant, 30-foot-long man-eating crocodile, which terrorizes Black Lake, Maine.

Lake Placid 2 (2007) 

In the sequel to the feature film, man-eating crocodiles return to the lake as two males and one aggressive female crocodile, which is protecting her nest, wreak havoc on the locals.

Lake Placid 3 (2010) 

A game warden moves his family to Lake Placid, once the site of deadly crocodile attacks. Locals assure him the crocs are gone, but his mischievous young son finds a few baby crocs and begins feeding them. They quickly grow into very big adults and start attacking the game warden's family and nearby town.

Lake Placid: The Final Chapter (2012) 

Reba the poacher is back, now an EPA agent. Black Lake is turned into a crocodile sanctuary surrounded by an electric fence. When the fence gets left open one night, a high-school field trip bus unknowingly enters the park. It's up to Reba and the sheriff to save the kids from becoming crocodile chow.

Lake Placid vs. Anaconda (2015) 

In Black Lake, Maine, an accident allows the two giant species, crocodiles and anacondas, to be regenerated and they escape towards Clear Lake. Now, Reba teams up with Tully to find his daughter Bethany and a group of sorority girls in a deadly match between the two creatures.

Lake Placid: Legacy (2018) 

A group of young explorers discover a secret area hidden from all maps and GPS devices. When they reach the center of the lake, they discover an abandoned facility that houses one of the largest and deadliest apex-predators known to man. Rather than a sequel, Legacy is considered to be a stand-alone film, not connected to the previous films and the only film in the series to not feature or reference the Bickerman family, declaring it a reboot.

Cast and crew

Cast 
 An  indicates an appearance through archival footage.
 A dark gray cell indicates the character was not in the film.

Crew

Reception

Critical and public response

Music

Soundtracks

Other media

Video games 
Lake Placid: Croc Drop is an interactive game produced in 1999 to promote the film Lake Placid from the same year.

Lake Placid 2: Croc Alley is an interactive game produced in 2007 to promote the film Lake Placid 2 from the same year.

References 

 
Film series introduced in 1999
20th Century Studios franchises
Sony Pictures franchises
Comedy film series
Horror film series
Action film series